Campo Limpo Paulista is a municipality in the state of São Paulo in Brazil. The population is 85,541 (2020 est.) in an area of 79.4 km². The elevation is 745 m.  The town is the seat of the Roman Catholic Diocese of Campo Limpo.

References

External links
  Campo Limpo Paulista Official Site
EncontraCampoLimpoPaulista - Find everything about Campo Limpo Paulista

Municipalities in São Paulo (state)